Marie Risby (born 20 April 1955) is a Swedish cross-country skier who competed during the 1970s and 80's. She participated in three Winter Olympics (1976, 1980 and 1984) and did her best results at the 1984 Winter Olympics in Sarajevo, when she finished fourth in the 5 km, fifth in the 20 km, fifth in the 4 × 5 km relay, and sixth in the 10 km events.

At the 1985 FIS Nordic World Ski Championships in Seefeld, Risby finished sixth in the 20 km and tenth in the 10 km events. Her lone World Cup victory was in a 5 km event in Finland in 1985, her last year as an active athlete.

Cross-country skiing results
All results are sourced from the International Ski Federation (FIS).

Olympic Games

World Championships

World Cup

Season standings

Individual podiums
1 victory
4 podiums

Team podiums

 1 podium

References

External links

Living people
1955 births
Cross-country skiers at the 1976 Winter Olympics
Cross-country skiers at the 1980 Winter Olympics
Cross-country skiers at the 1984 Winter Olympics
Olympic cross-country skiers of Sweden
Swedish female cross-country skiers
20th-century Swedish women